North Bay may refer to:

Places
Canada
North Bay, Ontario, a city in Ontario, Canada
CFB North Bay

United States
North Bay Village, Florida, a city in Miami-Dade County, Florida
North Bay, New York, an unincorporated community
North Bay, Door County, Wisconsin, an unincorporated community in Door County, Wisconsin
North Bay, Wisconsin, a village in Racine County, Wisconsin
North Bay Shore, New York, a census-designated place in Suffolk County, New York
North Bay (San Francisco Bay Area), a subregion of the San Francisco Bay Area in California

Others
North Bay Aqueduct, a part of the California State Water Project
North Bay Breakers, an American football (soccer) team based in Santa Rosa, California
North Bay Centennials, a defunct ice hockey team in the Ontario Hockey League
North Bay Battalion, a major junior ice hockey team in the Ontario Hockey League (2013 to present)

See also
Northbay
South Bay (disambiguation)
East Bay (disambiguation)
West Bay (disambiguation)